Bellot Mountain is a mountain in Passaic County, New Jersey. It is part of the Ramapo Mountains.

References 

Landforms of Passaic County, New Jersey
Mountains of New Jersey
Ramapos
Ringwood, New Jersey